Diocesan Girls' School (DGS) is one of the oldest girls' schools in Hong Kong, founded in Kowloon in 1860 by the Anglican Hong Kong Sheng Kung Hui to provide a well-rounded secondary education for girls.

Structure
DGS is governed by the Council of the Diocesan Girls' School. Having run as a grant-aided school since it was founded, the school commenced operation in the DSS mode starting with Secondary One classes in September 2005. English is the medium of instruction. By 2022, DGS accounts for a total of 49 winners of the Hong Kong Outstanding Students Awards, ranking first among all the secondary schools in Hong Kong, and outnumbering the combined number of winners of the next two schools. The school is also a member of the G20 Schools group. It has a "feeder" primary school known as Diocesan Girls' Junior School ("DGJS"), which is currently led by Mrs. Annie Lee.

History

Pre-war

DGS was originally named the Diocesan Native Female Training School in 1860, when it was founded at Bonham Road and Eastern Street  in Hong Kong Island. The school set up by Lady Lydia Smith, the wife of George Smith (Bishop of Victoria), who was the First Bishop of Victoria sent by the Society for Promotion of Female Education in the East, a sub-society of the London Missionary Society. At first, it admitted only girls. In 1866, it was renamed Diocesan Female School. Because of financial problems, the school had to restrict its services solely to orphans and destitute girls. In 1869, it became the Diocesan Home and Orphanage and accepted boys as well.

DGS first received government financial assistance in 1878 and was placed under the grant-in-aid scheme, officially establishing itself as a girls' school The boys would continue their education at the newly founded Diocesan Boys' School.

In 1913, the school finally moved to its present site in 1 Jordan Road, Kowloon, formerly a rice paddy field. In the 1920s, the school motto, Daily Giving Service, was adopted. During the Japanese occupation in the Second World War, the school was taken over as headquarters of the Japanese Kempeitai until it was re-opened in September 1945 by Ms. Gibbins, then headmistress, who was interned at Stanley camp during the occupation. Immediately upon her release, she hurried back to reclaim the school premises despite difficulty in crossing the harbour, thus saving the building from being looted.

Post war

In the 1950s, with the closure of the adjacent town-gas depot, the School was able to expand. The old Edwardian edifice was pulled down, and three school blocks were constructed to accommodate the enlarged student body. The school embarked on a large scale school expansion project, and two extension blocks were opened respectively in 1993 and 1996. The new phase of expansion had been completed and was opened officially on 12 January 2007.

In 2005, DGS joined the Direct Subsidy Scheme, so as to enhance the facilities to meet the demand of increased number of classes. In site redevelopment has been chosen against the use of a new site provided by the Education Bureau, based on cost considerations. The new school was designed by architects Palmer and Turner, and the preliminary designs was reviewed by a group of alumni. A fund-raising campaign was launched in 2008 for the redevelopment of the old school campus, which targets on HKD 380 million. In 2009, the classes in DGS were temporarily relocated to 101 Castle Peak Road, Sham Shui Po, whereas DGJS was moved to Tseung Kwan O during the reconstruction. In September 2011, the school returned to 1 Jordan Road upon completion of the new campus.

Headmistresses

Other related associations
St. Andrews Church in the Diocese of Western Kowloon in Hong Kong Sheng Kung Hui is the parish church of DGS.

List of Top Scorers in Public Examinations 
DGS has produced 38 perfect scorers "10As" in the history of Hong Kong Certificate of Education Examination (HKCEE) and 14 "Top Scorers" and "Super Top Scorers" in the history of Hong Kong Diploma of Secondary Education Examination (HKDSE), ranking the 2nd amongst all secondary schools in Hong Kong.

Alumnae
Rebecca Chan Chung
Solina Chau
Irene Cheng
Sarah Liao
Karen Mok

See also
Education in Hong Kong
List of secondary schools in Hong Kong
Diocesan Boys' School
Diocesan Native Female Training School

References

External links

Diocesan Girls' School – Official Homepage
Diocesan Girls' Junior School – Official Homepage
Diocesans Old Girls Association – Official Homepage

Protestant secondary schools in Hong Kong
Yau Tsim Mong District
Educational institutions established in 1860
Girls' schools in Hong Kong
Through Train schools
Anglican schools in Hong Kong
1860 establishments in the British Empire